was one of the administrative divisions of Korea under Japanese rule, with its capital at Heijō. The province consisted of modern-day South Pyongan, North Korea.

Population 
Number of people by nationality according to the 1936 census:

 Overall population: 1,434,540 people
 Japanese: 39,094 people
 Koreans: 1,390,298 people
 Other: 5,148 people

Administrative divisions

Cities 

 Heijō (capital)
 Chin'nanpo

Counties 

Daidō
Junsen
Mōzan
Yōtoku
Seisen
Kōtō
Chūwa
Ryūkō
Kōsei
Heigen
Anshū
Kaisen
Tokusen
Neietsu

Provincial governors 
The following people were provincial ministers before August 1919. This was then changed to the title of governor.

See also 
Provinces of Korea
Governor-General of Chōsen
Administrative divisions of Korea

Korea under Japanese rule
Former prefectures of Japan in Korea